The Ministry of Planning, Investment and Economic Development (MoPIED) is a government institution responsible for informing the country’s  socio-economic vision and turning it into practical policy actions in order to support  macroeconomic stability and sustainable growth in Somalia. The current Minister is H.E Mohamud A. Sheikh Farah (Beenebeene).

Ministry consists of four parts; the General Directorate of Planning, the National Institute of Statistics, International Cooperation and Monitaring and Evaluation.

See also
 Census
 Demographics

References

Somalia
Government ministries of Somalia
1960 establishments in Somalia